The Monster is an inverted roller coaster located at Walygator Parc amusement park in France. Built by Bolliger & Mabillard, the roller coaster originally opened in 1996 at Expoland in Japan. It was closed in 2007 and later relocated to Walygator Parc, where it reopened on 9 July 2010.

The layout

The ride begins with a left-hand turn into the lift that ascends 131 feet (40 m). At the top, the inverted train dips slightly before turning left ninety degrees as it drops 119 feet (36 m) down the first hill. From the bottom the train immediately enters a vertical loop. Next is the zero-g roll followed by the cobra roll which inverts riders twice.

After the cobra roll, the train climbs through an upward spiral and enters a straight section. Next the train dives down to the right transitioning into a brief straight section of track. Riders then enter the first of two corkscrews which rotates the train 360 degrees to the left. The track straightens briefly again before turning to the right and entering a short dip before taking riders into the second corkscrew (this portion of the ride is often referred to by enthusiasts as the "dip and flip"). The ride finishes with a 1.5 revolution flat helix where riders encounter strong positive G-forces before making one last left turn into the final brake run.

The ride is identical in layout to Raptor at Cedar Point, the only deviation being the absence of a midcourse brake run.

Late opening
The construction started in January/February 2010. Because of harsh weather, work began later than scheduled, and the inauguration, initially planned for April 10, 2010, was deferred. A second inauguration deferment occurred mid-June because the TÜV didn't approve opening the roller coaster, then, the park hasn't communicated any inauguration day until the coaster could open July 9, 2010 (without its painting).

Height and speed
The park announced a speed of 68 mph, though the manufacturer's specifications claim a top speed of 55.9 mph, which was the marketed speed at its previous location in Japan.

References

Roller coasters in France
Inverted roller coasters manufactured by Bolliger & Mabillard